Transborder may refer to:
 Transborder agglomeration, a conurbation that extends into multiple territories.
 Transborder Express, a bus company based in Canberra, Australia.
 Trans-Border Institute, an institute at the University of San Diego, United States.

See also
 Border
 Cross-border region